Mongolian units are the traditional units of measurement of the Mongolian people.

Length

Weight

See also
 Chinese, Taiwanese, Hong Kong, Korean, Japanese, & Vietnamese units of measure

References

Obsolete units of measurement
Systems of units
Units
Customary units of measurement
Units of measurement by country